Marignac-Laspeyres is a commune in the Haute-Garonne department in southwestern France.

Geography
The commune is bordered by four other communes: Terrebasse to the north, Alan to the west, Le Fréchet to the southwest, and finally by Martres-Tolosane to the southeast.

Population

See also
Communes of the Haute-Garonne department

References

Communes of Haute-Garonne